Matyunin (Russian: Матюнин) is a Russian masculine surname, its feminine counterpart is Matyunina. The surname may refer to the following notable people:
Aleksei Matyunin (born 1982), Russian football referee
Valeri Matyunin (1960–2018), Russian football player and referee, father of Aleksei

Russian-language surnames